This is a list of fellows of the Royal Society elected in 1726.

Fellows
 Richard Beard (c1688–1734), physician
 Bernard Forest de Belidor (1698–1761), French engineer
Sir William Billers (died 1745), Alderman, Sheriff and Lord Mayor of London
 Zabdiel Boylston (1679–1766), colonial physician (Massachusetts)
 Sir Brook Bridges (1679–1728), barrister 
 Kingsmill Eyre (1682–1743), Secretary of Chelsea Hospital and inventor
 Henry Walther Gerdes (1690–1742), German pastor
 Sir Jeffrey Gilbert (1674–1726), Chief Baron of the Exchequer
 Richard Graham (1693–1749), Comptroller of Westminster Bridge
 James Hargraves (1690–1741), Dean of Chichester
 Richard Hassell (died 1770) 
 Richard Holland (1688–1730), physician
 John Jeffreys (died 1741) 
 Robert Johnston Ketelbey (died 1743), barrister
 Thomas Palmer (c1685–1735), Recorder and MP of Bridgwater
 Edward Pawlet (died 1768), barrister
 Thomas Robinson (1703–1777), politician, architect and collector
 Edward Rudge (1703–1763), MP
 Meyer Low Schomberg (1690–1761), German physician in London
 Charles Stanhope (1673–1760) (1673–1760), barrister and MP
 Temple Stanyan (c1677–1752), author and politician
 James Stirling (1692–1770), mathematician
 Thomas White (died 1754), Clerk of the Errors

References

1726
1726 in science
1726 in England